Dear Tenant is a 2020 Taiwanese drama film directed by Cheng Yu-chieh starring Mo Tzu-yi, Chen Shu-fang and Runyin Bai. It was primarily filmed in Keelung city and contains themes such as homosexuality, euthanasia and adoption rights. The film won both Best Leading Actor for Mo and Best Supporting Actress for Chen at the 57th Golden Horse Awards.

Cast
 Mo Tzu-yi as Lin Jian-yi (林健一)
 Chen Shu-fang as Zhou Xiu-yu (周秀玉)
 Runyin Bai as Wang You-yu (王悠宇)
 Yao Chun-yao as Wang Li-wei (王立維)
 Jay Shih as Wang Li-gang (王立綱)

Awards and nominations

References

External links 

 

2020 LGBT-related films
LGBT-related romantic drama films
Gay-related films
Taiwanese LGBT-related films
2020s Mandarin-language films
Taiwanese-language films